Siva Vaidhyanathan (born 1966) is a cultural historian and media scholar, and the Robertson professor of Media Studies at the University of Virginia. Vaidhyanathan is a permanent columnist at The Guardian and Slate; he is also a frequent contributor on media and cultural issues in various periodicals including The Chronicle of Higher Education, New York Times Magazine, The Nation, Slate, and The Baffler. He directs the Center for Media and Citizenship at the University of Virginia, which produces a television show, a radio program, several podcasts, and the Virginia Quarterly Review.

Biography
Vaidhyanathan was born in Buffalo, New York, and attended the University of Texas at Austin, earning a BA in History in 1994 and a Ph.D. in 1999 in American Studies. From 1999 through the summer of 2007 he worked in the Department of Culture and Communication at New York University, the School of Library and Information Studies at the University of Wisconsin–Madison and Columbia University. From 1988 through 1993 he was a professional journalist working for several Texas daily newspapers.

He has appeared in an episode of The Daily Show with Jon Stewart to discuss early social network services. Vaidhyanathan has appeared in several documentary films, including Terms and Conditions May Apply (2013), Inside the Mind of Google (2009), and Freedom of Expression (2007). In 2016 Vaidhyanathan played a prominent role in the higher-education documentary, Starving the Beast. Vaidhyanathan was portrayed as a character on stage at the Public Theater in New York City in a play called  Privacy (2016). 

Vaidhyanathan is a fellow of the New York Institute for the Humanities and the Institute for the Future of the Book. Vaidhyanathan serves on the board of the Digital Public Library of America.

Selected books
 Copyrights and Copywrongs: The Rise of Intellectual Property and How It Threatens Creativity, NYU Press, 2001.
 The Anarchist in the Library: How the Clash Between Freedom and Control Is Hacking the Real World and Crashing the System, Basic Books, 2004.
 Rewiring the Nation: The Place of Technology in American Studies, co-edited with Carolyn de la Peña, Johns Hopkins University Press, 2007.
 The Googlization of Everything -- and Why We Should Worry, University of California Press, 2011.. The text was in open development on a blog, launched September 27, 2007 in collaboration with the Institute for the Future of the Book.
 Intellectual Property: A Very Short Introduction, Oxford University Press, 2017.
 Antisocial Media: How Facebook Disconnects Us And Undermines Democracy, Oxford University Press, 2018.

See also 
 Anti-copyright
 Good Copy Bad Copy
 Mashup (music)
 Steal This Film
 Googlization

References

 Camp, L. Jean.  DRM: doesn't really mean digital copyright management
 Eschenfelder, Kristin R. (2007) Every Library's Nightmare? Digital Rights Management and Licensed Scholarly Digital Resources
 Ross, Andrew.  "Technology and Below-the-Line Labor in the Copyfight over Intellectual Property". American Quarterly, Volume 58, Number 3, September 2006, pp. 743–766
 Vaidhyanathan, Siva.  "Critical Information Studies: A Bibliographic Manifesto".  Cultural Studies 20(2/3) (March/May 2006): 292–315.  ISSN 0950-2386 Download the .pdf

External links
 Video of Vaidhyanathan discussing social media in 2005 on The Daily Show with Jon Stewart.
 Videos of conversations and discussions involving Vaidhyanathan on Bloggingheads.tv
 Video: Siva Vaidhyanathan discusses The Googlization of Everything (And Why We Should Worry) on Forum Network.
 

1966 births
Copyright activists
Copyright scholars
Intellectual property activism
Living people
American bloggers
University of Virginia School of Law faculty
University of Texas at Austin College of Liberal Arts alumni
Academics from New York (state)
Writers from Buffalo, New York
American male non-fiction writers